Christine Robinson (born May 17, 1984, in Pointe-Claire, Quebec) is a Canadian water polo player. She is a student at McGill University. She was part of the 7th place women's water polo team at the 2004 Summer Olympics. She won a gold medal at the 2003 FINA Junior Water Polo World Championships in Calgary.

See also
 List of World Aquatics Championships medalists in water polo

References

External links
 
 

1984 births
Living people
Canadian female water polo players
Olympic water polo players of Canada
Water polo players at the 2004 Summer Olympics
Water polo players at the 2007 Pan American Games
Water polo players at the 2011 Pan American Games
People from Pointe-Claire
Water polo people from Quebec
Anglophone Quebec people
World Aquatics Championships medalists in water polo
Pan American Games silver medalists for Canada
Pan American Games medalists in water polo
Water polo players at the 2015 Pan American Games
Medalists at the 2011 Pan American Games
Medalists at the 2015 Pan American Games